The special geographic area (SGA) is a loose collection of 63 barangays in six municipalities of the province of Cotabato in the Philippines. The SGA is part of the Bangsamoro Autonomous Region in Muslim Mindanao, despite the province of Cotabato itself being part of a separate region – Soccsksargen.

These barangays were partitioned from Soccsksargen following a two-part plebiscite held in January and February 2019 which formed Bangsamoro after residents of said barangays consented their localities' inclusion to the new autonomous region. The municipalities these barangays are a part of, as well as the barangays themselves remain part of Cotabato. These barangays could be reorganized into one or more new municipalities, or be merged with any of the neighboring municipalities in Maguindanao province which is part of Bangsamoro.

The Bangsamoro regional government started effective governance over these barangays since the official turnover of these localities to the region by the Cotabato provincial government on November 20, 2019.

Some of these barangays are exclaves entirely surrounded by localities not part of Bangsamoro.

History

The Philippine government organized a two-part plebiscite which concerns the ratification of the Bangsamoro Organic Law, the founding basis of the then to be established Bangsamoro Autonomous Region in Muslim Mindanao (BARMM) which was intended to replace the Autonomous Region in Muslim Mindanao (ARMM) and the expansion of scope of the then-proposed Bangsamoro autonomous region to potentially include municipalities in Lanao del Norte, Isabela City in Basilan, Cotabato City, and select barangays in Cotabato province. For the prospective barangays in Cotabato to join, voters in all of the parent municipality also had to consent their bid to join BARMM.

Out of 67 barangays of Cotabato that were included in the plebiscite, 63 had successful bids for their inclusion in the Bangsamoro autonomous region. The four that rejected the measure are Galidan in Tulunan, Balatican in Pikit, and Pagangan and Lower Mingading in Aleosan; these four were excluded from BARMM and remained part of Soccsksargen. Meanwhile, each municipality consented to its barangays in joining the BARMM. In Pikit, the most populous municipality in Cotabato, all but one barangay that voted in the plebiscite to join declined. This led to 20 barangays staying out of the BARMM, out of 42. Pikit's town hall, which is located in Fort Pikit, one of the barangays that voted for inclusion, is being petitioned to be annexed by Poblacion, one of the towns that didn't petition to be included.

The barangays in Aleosan and Tulunan voted in favor of their inclusion but majority of voters in the rest of their parent municipalities voted against the barangays' inclusion. Barangay Baltican in Pikit rejected their inclusion while the rest of Pikit consented the barangay's inclusion and would have been part of the new autonomous region if Baltican voters also voted for their inclusion.

Upon the effective foundation of the new Bangsamoro autonomous region, the barangays remained part of their parent municipalities. Their residents voted for municipal officials of their parent municipalities and Cotabato provincial officials in the 2019 Philippine general election. The barangays could be reorganized into one or more municipalities or merged with any of the neighboring municipalities of Maguindanao.

The full transfer of jurisdiction of the Cotabato barangays to the Bangsamoro autonomous government were ordered by Secretary of the Interior and Local Government Eduardo Año following a meeting with Bangsamoro Chief Minister Murad Ebrahim on July 8, 2019.

These barangays were still not under the effective control of Bangsamoro as of July 2019 since they were not yet officially turned over to Bangsamoro regional government which was initially set to occur once a local government code is passed by the Bangsamoro Parliament.

With the local government code still pending, the official turnover took place on November 20, 2019. The Sangguniang Panlalawigan of Cotabato has passed a resolution concerning the transfer. Amidst budgetary concerns, the barangays were assured that they will still receive their Internal Revenue Allocation directly from the Department of Budget and Management after the transfer takes place.

By March 2020, the 63 barangays were already grouped into a special geographic area of the Bangsamoro region.

Chief Minister Murad Ebrahim issued an executive order establishing a Development Coordinating Office (DCO) led by an administrator and eight area coordinators to manage affairs in the 63 barangays in Cotabato. Mohammad Kelie Antao was appointed as administrator on June 30, 2020. Jimmy Adil, Jabib Guiabar, Esmael Maguid, Duma Mascud, Ibrahim Rahman, Abdulatip Tiago, and Nayang Timan were appointed as area coordinators on the same date.

A second ceremony was held on December 15, 2020, to mark the symbolic assumption of the Bangsamoro regional government over the 63 Cotabato barangays along with Cotabato City.

Governance
The special geographic area of Bangsamoro consists of barangays that are part of Cotabato province which is not part of the autonomous region despite the barangays themselves being part of Bangsamoro. For the Bangsamoro region to govern the barangays, these were constituted into a single administrative area under the direct supervision of the Bangsamoro chief minister through the region's Ministry of the Interior and Local Government (MILG). The MILG deals with affairs of the area through the Special Geographic Area Development Authority which is headed by an administrator appointed by the chief minister.

Subdivisions

Area clusters

The 63 barangays in the special geographic area in Bangsamoro is grouped into eight area clusters.

List of barangays

Barangays per municipality

Proposed reorganization
In September 2019, there was a reported proposal to reorganize the Cotabato barangays into four municipalities through regional legislation and possibly annex them to the neighboring Maguindanao province. Pending the passage of the regional law, there is a plan by Chief Minister Murad Ebrahim to issue an executive order to group the barangays into eight clusters. However such plan to form towns from the barangays was temporarily set aside and it was decided that an administrative body to be formed to oversee the barangays' affairs.

Another proposal was to group the barangays into three municipalities instead of four. One of the proposed municipalities is Sultan Tambilawan, which is planned to consist of Midsayap's 13 barangays.

The regional government will wait for the results of the 2020 census to determine the exact barangays that would be reorganized into new towns.

On December 21, 2022, a proposal was made to group the barangays into eight municipalities. The municipalities are namely Pahamudin, Kadayangan, Kabalukan, Northern Kabacan, Kapalawan, Malmar, Tugunan and Ligawasan.

References

Barangays in Cotabato
Populated places in Cotabato
Enclaves and exclaves